Darnell Alford (born June 11, 1977) is a former American football guard. He was drafted in the sixth round of the 2000 NFL Draft. He played for the Kansas City Chiefs from 2000 to 2001 and for the New York Jets in 2002. Alford was also briefly on the rosters of the Dallas Cowboys and again with the Kansas City Chiefs in 2002. Alford was out of football during the 2003 season and returned with the St. Louis Rams in 2004. He did not appear in any games for the Rams.

References

1977 births
Living people
American football offensive guards
Boston College Eagles football players
Kansas City Chiefs players
Berlin Thunder players
New York Jets players
Players of American football from Newark, New Jersey